The Bournville Cricket Ground in Birmingham, England was used for first-class cricket by Worcestershire County Cricket Club on two occasions. In 1910 they drew with Essex, and the following year they beat Surrey by two wickets.

Warwickshire played Second XI matches here for a few years in the 1960s and 1970s. The ground also hosted four games in the ICC Trophy in 1979 (1), 1982 (2) and 1986 (1).

The ground is now home to Bournville Cricket Club during the summer, who currently compete in the Warwickshire Cricket League.

Records

First-class
 Highest team total: 301/8 by Worcestershire v Surrey, 1911
 Lowest team total: 198 by Worcestershire v Essex, 1910; and by Worcestershire v Surrey, 1911
 Highest individual innings: 107 by Frederick Pearson for Worcestershire v Surrey, 1911
 Best bowling in an innings: 5/53 by Thomas Rushby for Surrey v Worcestershire, 1911

References
 Bournville Cricket Ground from CricketArchive. Retrieved 9 December 2006.

Cricket grounds in the West Midlands (county)
Sports venues in Birmingham, West Midlands